Arbër Shytani (born 25 January 1985, in Shkodër) is an Albanian retired footballer who last played as a defender for Tërbuni Pukë in the Albanian First Division.

References

External links
 Profile - FSHF

1985 births
Living people
Footballers from Shkodër
Albanian footballers
Association football defenders
KS Ada Velipojë players
KF Laçi players
KF Tërbuni Pukë players
Besëlidhja Lezhë players
Kategoria Superiore players
Kategoria e Parë players